The Si Phan Don (meaning '4,000 islands') is a riverine archipelago in the Mekong River, Champasak Province in southern Laos. Si Phan Don is part of Khong District, including the islands and part of the mainland in the east. Si Phan Don is dotted with numerous islands, half of which are submerged when the Mekong River is in flood. The principal islands of Si Phan Don are Don Khong (the largest), Don Som (the second largest), Don Det and Don Khon. Si Phan Don borders Cambodia and historical and cultural ties link the people on both side of the border. Pakse is the closest of the bigger cities in Laos to the area. 

Key features of the Si Phan Don archipelago include:

The remains of the first railway in Laos, the Don Det–Don Khon narrow gauge railway, built by the French to bypass the Khone Phapheng Falls and enable vessels, freight, and passengers to travel along the Mekong River.

The Khone Phapheng Falls, a succession of impassable rapids that gave rise to the construction of the railway.

In the past, timber was logged on the islands, but it is now regulated; illegal logging incurs stiff penalties.

While the local economies are predominantly based on agriculture, the Si Phan Don archipelago has seen an increasing number of visitors. Tourism is concentrated on Don Khong, Don Det and Don Khon. Many of the other islands are rarely visited.

Gallery

References

Geography of Champasak province
River islands of Laos
Tourist attractions in Laos
Islands of the Mekong River